Plaster Hounds is the second studio album by Chromatics. It was released in 2004 on the Gold Standard Laboratories record label.

Overview
It contains a cover version of "Program" by the Silver Apples.

Track listing

Personnel
Maximillion Ronald Avila - drums, percussion, and vocals
Adam Miller -  bass, drum programming, guitar, percussion, vocals, photography
Nate Preston - saxophone
Jeremy Romagna - producer
Nat Sahlstrom - bass, guitar, and vocals
Aleesha Whitley - Percussion
Yume Nakajima - photography
Chromatics - mixer, writer, producer

Recorded in July 2003 at the Type Foundry

References

2004 albums
Chromatics (band) albums
Gold Standard Laboratories albums